The 1977–78 NBA season was the team's 17th season in the NBA and their 5th season in the city of Washington, D.C. It would prove to be their most successful season, as they would win their first and only NBA championship . In the NBA Finals, they defeated the Seattle SuperSonics in seven games.

The Bullets got off to a slow start in the regular season, losing 6 of their first 10 games. On January 13, the Bullets beat the defending Champion Portland Trail Blazers to improve to 24–15, capping an 18–5 run over 23 games. Injuries would begin to have an effect on the team as the Bullets struggled, as they would lose 13 of their next 18 games. Hovering a few games above .500 for the rest of the season, the Bullets managed to make the playoffs with a 44–38 record. They hold the record for the lowest win total of any NBA Championship winning team. The 1968–69 Boston Celtics, 1974–75 Golden State Warriors, 1976–77 Portland Trail Blazers, and 1994–95 Houston Rockets are the only other NBA championship teams to have won below 50 games in non-lockout seasons since 1958; all of them won more than 44 games.

Offseason

NBA Draft

Roster

Season standings

Regular season

Record vs. opponents

Game log
Key:  Win  Loss

Notes:

 All times are EASTERN time. (UTC–4 and UTC–5 starting October 30)

Player stats
Note: GP= Games played; REB= Rebounds; AST= Assists; STL = Steals; BLK = Blocks; PTS = Points; AVG = Average

Playoffs

|- align="center" bgcolor="#ccffcc"
| 1
| April 12
| Atlanta
| W 103–94
| Bob Dandridge (20)
| Wes Unseld (15)
| Wes Unseld (7)
| Capital Centre9,326
| 1–0
|- align="center" bgcolor="#ccffcc"
| 2
| April 14
| @ Atlanta
| W 107–103 (OT)
| Kevin Grevey (41)
| Wes Unseld (15)
| Tom Henderson (5)
| Omni Coliseum15,601
| 2–0
|-

|- align="center" bgcolor="#ffcccc"
| 1
| April 16
| @ San Antonio
| L 103–114
| Elvin Hayes (26)
| Elvin Hayes (15)
| Elvin Hayes (6)
| HemisFair Arena9,669
| 0–1
|- align="center" bgcolor="#ccffcc"
| 2
| April 18
| @ San Antonio
| W 121–117
| Kevin Grevey (31)
| Wes Unseld (13)
| Larry Wright (8)
| HemisFair Arena9,871
| 1–1
|- align="center" bgcolor="#ccffcc"
| 3
| April 21
| San Antonio
| W 118–105
| Bob Dandridge (28)
| Elvin Hayes (12)
| Wes Unseld (8)
| Capital Centre17,417
| 2–1
|- align="center" bgcolor="#ccffcc"
| 4
| April 23
| San Antonio
| W 98–95
| Bob Dandridge (24)
| Elvin Hayes (13)
| Bob Dandridge (8)
| Capital Centre13,459
| 3–1
|- align="center" bgcolor="#ffcccc"
| 5
| April 25
| @ San Antonio
| L 105–116
| Charles Johnson (21)
| Elvin Hayes (13)
| Wes Unseld (6)
| HemisFair Arena9,709
| 3–2
|- align="center" bgcolor="#ccffcc"
| 6
| April 28
| San Antonio
| W 103–100
| Elvin Hayes (25)
| Wes Unseld (16)
| Wes Unseld (5)
| Capital Centre19,035
| 4–2
|-

|- align="center" bgcolor="#ccffcc"
| 1
| April 30
| @ Philadelphia
| W 122–117 (OT)
| Elvin Hayes (28)
| Elvin Hayes (18)
| Tom Henderson (9)
| Spectrum13,708
| 1–0
|- align="center" bgcolor="#ffcccc"
| 2
| May 3
| @ Philadelphia
| L 104–110
| Elvin Hayes (26)
| Elvin Hayes (15)
| Wright, Henderson (8)
| Spectrum18,276
| 1–1
|- align="center" bgcolor="#ccffcc"
| 3
| May 5
| Philadelphia
| W 123–108
| Bob Dandridge (30)
| Elvin Hayes (12)
| Bob Dandridge (7)
| Capital Centre19,035
| 2–1
|- align="center" bgcolor="#ccffcc"
| 4
| May 7
| Philadelphia
| W 121–105
| Elvin Hayes (35)
| Elvin Hayes (19)
| four players tied (6)
| Capital Centre19,035
| 3–1
|- align="center" bgcolor="#ffcccc"
| 5
| May 10
| @ Philadelphia
| L 94–107
| Larry Wright (18)
| Hayes, Unseld (16)
| Wes Unseld (5)
| Spectrum18,276
| 3–2
|- align="center" bgcolor="#ccffcc"
| 6
| May 12
| Philadelphia
| W 101–99
| Bob Dandridge (28)
| Wes Unseld (15)
| Tom Henderson (6)
| Capital Centre19,035
| 4–2
|-

|- align="center" bgcolor="#ffcccc"
| 1
| May 21
| @ Seattle
| L 102–106
| Kevin Grevey (27)
| Elvin Hayes (9)
| Tom Henderson (7)
| Seattle Center Coliseum14,098
| 0–1
|- align="center" bgcolor="#ccffcc"
| 2
| May 25
| Seattle
| W 106–98
| Bob Dandridge (34)
| Wes Unseld (15)
| Henderson, Unseld (5)
| Capital Centre19,035
| 1–1
|- align="center" bgcolor="#ffcccc"
| 3
| May 28
| Seattle
| L 92–93
| Elvin Hayes (29)
| Elvin Hayes (20)
| Bob Dandridge (6)
| Capital Centre19,035
| 1–2
|- align="center" bgcolor="#ccffcc"
| 4
| May 30
| @ Seattle
| W 120–116 (OT)
| Bob Dandridge (23)
| Elvin Hayes (13)
| Tom Henderson (11)
| Kingdome39,457
| 2–2
|- align="center" bgcolor="#ffcccc"
| 5
| June 2
| @ Seattle
| L 94–98
| Kevin Grevey (22)
| Bob Dandridge (10)
| Tom Henderson (6)
| Seattle Center Coliseum14,098
| 2–3
|- align="center" bgcolor="#ccffcc"
| 6
| June 4
| Seattle
| W 117–82
| Elvin Hayes (21)
| Elvin Hayes (15)
| Greg Ballard (6)
| Capital Centre19,035
| 3–3
|- align="center" bgcolor="#ccffcc"
| 7
| June 7
| @ Seattle
| W 105–99
| Dandridge, Johnson (19)
| Wes Unseld (9)
| Wes Unseld (6)
| Seattle Center Coliseum14,098
| 4–3
|-

NBA Finals

After being swept in their previous two trips to the NBA Finals (by Milwaukee in 1971 and Golden State in 1975), the Bullets lost Game 1 on the road against the Seattle SuperSonics, and a 19-point lead vanished in the process.
In Game 4, the Bullets rose to the occasion beating the Sonics 120–116 to even the series at 2 games apiece. After losing Game 5 in Seattle, the Bullets kept their hopes alive with a dominating 117–82 win at the Capital Centre. Game 7 returned to Seattle and the Bullets were a heavy underdog. Kevin Grevey suffered a sprained wrist above his shooting hand, and Bob Dandridge was forced to see some action at guard.  Dandridge would play strongly and scored 19 points to tie with Charles Johnson, who hit a half court shot at the end of the 3rd quarter, for the team high. Wes Unseld scored 15 points while pulling down 9 rebounds as the Bullets emerged with a 105–99 victory to win their first NBA Championship.

Playoffs player stats
Note: GP= Games played; REB= Rebounds; AST= Assists; STL = Steals; BLK = Blocks; PTS = Points; AVG = Average

Awards and honors
 Wes Unseld, NBA Finals Most Valuable Player Award

References

 Bullets on Basketball Reference

Eastern Conference (NBA) championship seasons
NBA championship seasons
Washington Wizards seasons
Washington
Wash
Wash